Isalo is a rural municipality in Madagascar. It belongs to the district of Miandrivazo, which is a part of Menabe Region. The population of the commune was estimated to be approximately 12,930 in 2009.

Only Primary schooling is available. The majority 50% of the population of the commune are Farmers, while an additional 30% receives their livelihood from raising livestock. The most important crop is beans, while other important products are maize and rice. Services provide employment for 10% of the population. Additionally, fishing employs 10% of the population.

Roads
This municipality is situated at 38 km south-west of Miandrivazo. Only unpaved secondary roads lead to the municipality. These are praticable but in a bad state of conversation and it takes 1.1/2h to reach the village.

Fokontany (villages)
8 villages (fokontany) are part of the municipality:
Isalo - 2750 habitants
Analambiby - 3524 habitants
Soatana Morlot - 955 habitants
Antsikida - 1250 habitants
Bepaha - 1204 habitants
Mahatsinjo - 1205  habitants
Adabozato - 900 habitants
Soafaniry Mahavelo (also called Beoro) - 1142   habitants

Rivers
The Tsiribihina River and the Mahajilo River that flows west of Bepaha in this municipality.

References

Populated places in Menabe